Miss India Worldwide 2000 was the tenth edition of the international beauty pageant. The final was held in Tampa, Florida, United States on  November 25, 2000. About 16 countries were represented in the pageant. Ritu Upadhyay  of the  United States was crowned as the winner at the end of the event.

Results

Special awards

Delegates
 – Retu Jahlan
 – Sapna Malini
 – Unknown
 – Unknown
 – Sheetal Shah
 – Munchan Ahmed Ghelani
 – Preeti Ghelani
 – Jayalaxmi Appadorai
 – Nikita Bhandari Kshatriya
 – Rovana Shankar
 – Vanitha Veerasamy
 – Subashnie Devkaran
 – Namita Ajodhia
 – Unknown
 – Simran Kochar
 – Ritu Upadhyay

References

External links
http://www.worldwidepageants.com/

2002 beauty pageants